Shahed 274 is an Iranian-made light utility helicopter, reportedly developed by the Islamic Revolutionary Guard Corps.

History 
According to Jane's, the helicopter was known with the tentative name 'X-5' in the Institute of Industrial Research and Development of the Islamic Revolutionary Guard Corps, where it was developed during the 1990s. The aircraft made its first flight reportedly in 1997, and the first instance was delivered on 16 September 1999 (with the tail number 71-823). The public international debut of Shahed 274 was held on 30 December 2000, in Tehran. By the end of 2001, it is known that two more helicopters with tail number 74-001 and 74-002 were in service. From October to November 2002, the helicopters were put on display at Iran Kish Air Show. By the end of 2004, it was reported that 20 or 30 were planned, but no evidence of were available as of 2006, and status of the project was also unknown.

Specifications

References

External links 
 Profile at GlobalSecurity.org

Shahed 274
1990s Iranian military utility aircraft
Aircraft first flown in 1997